Santianes is one of thirteen parishes (administrative divisions) in Teverga, a municipality within the province and autonomous community of Asturias, in northern Spain.  

The postal code is 33111.

Villages and hamlets
Bárzana
Campiello (Campiellu)
Castro (Castru)
Cuarteles
Gradura
Hedrada (Drada)
Infiesta
Medión
Murias
Prado (Prau)
Santianes

References

Parishes in Teverga